The Ministry of Foreign Affairs is the ministry responsible for handling the Federation of Saint Kitts and Nevis' external relations and its diplomatic missions abroad. The ministry's current director is Minister of Foreign Affairs and Aviation, Denzil Douglas.

Diplomacy
Although Saint Kitts and Nevis maintains formal and friendly ties with many of its neighbors and major regional and world powers, countries such as the United States do not have permanent representatives on the islands. The U.S. State Department, for example, has ambassadors and consular staff present in nearby Barbados and Antigua.

List of ministers
This is a list of Ministers of Foreign Affairs of Saint Kitts and Nevis:

1983–1995: Kennedy Simmonds
1995–2000: Denzil Douglas
2000–2001: Sam Condor
2001–2008: Timothy Harris
2008–2010: Denzil Douglas
2010–2013: Sam Condor
2013–2015: Patrice Nisbett
2015–2022: Mark Brantley
2022: Vincent Byron
2022–present: Denzil Douglas

See also
 Foreign relations of Saint Kitts and Nevis
 List of diplomatic missions of Saint Kitts and Nevis

Notes

External links
 Official Ministry website

Government of Saint Kitts and Nevis
Saint Kitts and Nevis